West Windsor may refer to:

 West Windsor, Vermont
 West Windsor, Michigan, an unincorporated community in Eaton County, Michigan
 West Windsor Township, New Jersey
 Windsor West, the electoral district